Forks may refer to:

Forks, Washington, a town in the United States
Forks Township, Northampton County, Pennsylvania, a township in the United States
Forks Township, Sullivan County, Pennsylvania, a township in the United States

See also
Fork (disambiguation)
The Forks (disambiguation)